All Mine may refer to:

"All Mine" (f(x) song), 2016
"All Mine" (Kanye West song), 2018
"All Mine" (Portishead song), 1997
"All Mine", a song by Brent Faiyaz from the album Wasteland, 2022